American Utopia is the tenth studio album by Scottish-American rock musician David Byrne, released on March 9, 2018 through Todo Mundo and Nonesuch Records. The release is his first true solo studio album since 2004's Grown Backwards, and serves as a musical component of a larger multimedia project titled Reasons to Be Cheerful, which attempts to spread positivity. Byrne announced the album and posted its lead single, "Everybody's Coming to My House", online on January 8, 2018. The album received a Grammy Award nomination for Best Alternative Music Album.

Recording and release
The album is part of a larger multimedia project titled Reasons to Be Cheerful which aims to give reasons for being happy and optimistic in spite of political strife and environmental problems. The title is derived from the Ian Dury song "Reasons to Be Cheerful, Part 3".

Reception

Critical reception

American Utopia received generally positive reviews from critics. At Metacritic, which assigns a normalized rating out of 100 to reviews from mainstream critics, the album has an average score of 72 based on 32 reviews, indicating "generally favorable reviews". The Arts Desk's Howard Male gave the album a positive review calling it a "a muscular and quirky return to form". Erik Adams of The A.V. Club gave the album a B, calling the album an uneven "mixed bag" but praising the album's themes.

Commercial reception
American Utopia became Byrne's first solo top 10 album on the Billboard 200, debuting at No. 3 with the equivalent of 63,000 copies sold in the United States.

Adaptations

The release of the album was backed by a world tour that lasted from March to November 2018. The elaborate concert featured an empty stage surrounded by metal chains and a cast of twelve musicians (including Byrne himself) sporting bare feet and wearing identical gray suits. Cutting-edge technology in wireless audio, MIDI, lighting and real-time tracking was used to totally untether the musicians from any cables, allowing free movement and complex choreography like in Byrne's previous tours. In addition to songs from American Utopia, the setlist incorporated material from Byrne's solo catalogue, several hits by Talking Heads and a cover of Janelle Monáe's "Hell You Talmbout".
 
In September 2019, an altered version of the concert was previewed at the Colonial Theatre in Boston. It now featured small changes to the setlist and to the structure to achieve a format closer to that of a musical stage production. It premiered on Broadway at the Hudson Theatre in previews on October 4, 2019 and officially on October 20, closing on February 16, 2020. A second run, scheduled to start in September 2020, was postponed by the COVID-19 pandemic. It was eventually moved to the St. James Theatre, where it started on September 17, 2021 and ended on April 3, 2022.

A cast recording of the production titled American Utopia on Broadway was released in 2019 and received a Grammy Award for Best Musical Theater Album nomination. A documentary/concert film version of the Broadway production was directed by Spike Lee and released in late 2020, on HBO.

An homonymous picture book was released in late 2020, intended to be a companion piece to the Broadway show. The book includes words and lyrics by Byrne and illustrations by Maira Kalman.

Track listing
All songs written by David Byrne and Brian Eno, except where noted.
"I Dance Like This" – 3:33
"Gasoline and Dirty Sheets" – 3:19
"Every Day Is a Miracle" – 4:46
"Dog's Mind" – 2:29
"This Is That" (Byrne, Daniel Lopatin) – 4:31
"It's Not Dark Up Here" – 4:10
"Bullet" – 3:09
"Doing the Right Thing" – 3:38
"Everybody's Coming to My House" – 3:29
"Here" (Byrne, Lopatin) – 4:13

Deluxe digital edition bonus tracks, Live from Kings Theatre, September 2018
"I Zimbra" (Byrne, Eno, Hugo Ball) – 3:12
"Every Day Is a Miracle" – 4:49
"Everybody's Coming to My House" – 3:44
"This Must Be the Place (Naive Melody)" (Byrne, Chris Frantz, Jerry Harrison, Tina Weymouth) – 4:54
"Dog's Mind" – 2:57
"Toe Jam" (Byrne, Dylan Mills) – 3:43

Personnel

Personnel according to David Byrne's homepage.
David Byrne – vocals; guitar on "I Dance Like This", "Gasoline and Dirty Sheets", "Every Day Is a Miracle", "It's Not Dark Up Here", "Bullet", "Doing the Right Thing", "Everybody's Coming to My House", and "Here"; keyboards on "I Dance Like This", "Gasoline and Dirty Sheets", "Bullet", and "Everybody's Coming to My House"; pads on "Everybody's Coming to My House"; production
Airhead – drums on "Bullet"
Ben Anderson – cymbal on "Every Day Is a Miracle"
Isaiah Barr – saxophone on "Gasoline and Dirty Sheets" and "Everybody's Coming to My House"
Thomas Bartlett (Doveman) – Mellotron on "I Dance Like This" "Gasoline and Dirty Sheets", "Bullet", and "Everybody's Coming to My House"; piano on "I Dance Like This"
Jamie Edwards – sitar samples on "Gasoline and Dirty Sheets"
Brian Eno – drum programming, vocoder, background vocals and "prog ride tracks" on "I Dance Like This"; keyboards on "It's Not Dark Up Here" and "Doing the Right Thing"; percussion on "It's Not Dark Up Here" and "Everybody's Coming to My House"; voice effects, whistling, celeste, and brass on "It's Not Dark Up Here"; drums on "Doing the Right Thing"; "robot rhythm guitar" on "Everybody's Coming to My House"; original tracks
Alex Epton – drum programming on "Gasoline and Dirty Sheets", "It's Not Dark Up Here", and "Doing the Right Thing"; choir programming on "Gasoline and Dirty Sheets", synthesizer stabs on "Every Day Is a Miracle", bass guitar on "Bullet", cymbals on "Doing the Right Thing"; shaker on "Everybody's Coming to My House"
Ethan P. Flynn – "middle 8 section synthesizer" on "Everybody's Coming to My House"
Happa – drum programming on "Gasoline and Dirty Sheets" and "Everybody's Coming to My House", electronics and drums on "Every Day Is a Miracle", synthesizer solo on "Everybody's Coming to My House"
Jam City – synth stabs, guitar, and drums on "Every Day Is a Miracle"
Nathan Jenkins – harmonica solo and voices on "Gasoline and Dirty Sheets"
Koreless – drums on "Every Day Is a Miracle"
Daniel Lopatin – keyboards on "Dog's Mind", "This Is That", "Doing the Right Thing", and "Here", drums on "Dog's Mind", "This Is That", and "Here", synthesizers and bass on "Dog's Mind", processing and textures on "Doing the Right Thing" and "Everybody's Coming to My House"; strings on "Doing the Right Thing"
Rodaidh McDonald – arrangements on "Gasoline and Dirty Sheets", "Every Day Is a Miracle", "Dog's Mind", "This Is That", and "Here"; additional keyboards on "I Dance Like This", "Gasoline and Dirty Sheets", "Every Day Is a Miracle", "It's Not Dark Up Here", "Doing the Right Thing", "Everybody's Coming to My House"; drum programming on "Gasoline and Dirty Sheets", "Every Day Is a Miracle", "Dog's Mind", "This Is That", "It's Not Dark Up Here", "Bullet" "Doing the Right Thing", and "Everybody's Coming to My House"; "verse percussion" on "I Dance Like This", bells on "It's Not Dark Up Here", strings on "Bullet"; production
MMPH – main orchestral arrangement and sounds on "Doing the Right Thing"
Magnus Bang Olsen – piano on "Every Day Is a Miracle"
Jack Peñate – keyboards on "Gasoline and Dirty Sheets", "Every Day Is a Miracle", and "Bullet"; backing vocals on "Gasoline and Dirty Sheets" and "Bullet"; textures on "Gasoline and Dirty Sheets"; drums, bass and shaker on "Every Day Is a Miracle"
Ariel Rechtshaid – flexatone on "It's Not Dark Up Here"
Ben Reed – live bass on "Every Day Is a Miracle" and "Everybody's Coming to My House"
Mauro Refosco – percussion on "It's Not Dark Up Here", "Bullet", "Doing the Right Thing", and "Everybody's Coming to My House"
Sampha – piano on "Everybody's Coming to My House"
Jaakko Savolainen – guitar, bass guitar, and synthesizer on "Gasoline and Dirty Sheets"; keyboards on "Every Day Is a Miracle"
Joey Waronker – tom and snare on "I Dance Like This"
Joe Williams – harp on "This Is That"
Brian Wolfe – drums on "Doing the Right Thing"

Technical personnel
Greg Calbi – mastering
Matt Cohn – recording engineering
Pat Dillett – production
Alex Epton – recording engineering
Tuck Nelson – mixing engineering
Marta Salogni – mixing engineering
Gabriel Schuman – additional engineering on "This Is That"
Jack Sugden – mixing engineering
David Wrench – mixing and additional programming
Purvis Young – cover art

Charts

References

External links
Official website of the "Reasons to be Cheerful" multimedia project
Credits and lyrics from David Byrne's site
American Utopia on Nonesuch Records
Lecture Byrne gave at The New School announcing the project
Stream for "Everybody's Coming to My House"
"This Must Be David Byrne" from GQ

2018 albums
Albums produced by Brian Eno
Albums produced by David Byrne
Albums produced by Rodaidh McDonald
David Byrne albums
Todo Mundo albums
Nonesuch Records albums
Albums produced by Pat Dillett